Prospect Village is a small village in the Cannock Chase District of Staffordshire, West Midlands, England. Located between Burntwood and Hednesford. The village is very small with residential houses, a village hall, a pub and service garage. The near churches are in Gentleshaw and Cannock Wood. The village was on a mineral-only line from Hednesford to Burntwood. A former embankment is still visible on Ironstone Road and Cannock Wood Road

References

Populated places in Staffordshire
Cannock Chase District